Sounds of the Spirit (S.O.S. Radio) is a network of 29 radio stations in the United States broadcasting a Contemporary Christian format. The stations and network are owned by Faith Communications Corporation a non-profit corporation which is listener-supported.

Stations
Sounds of the Spirit has 28 radio stations. The network's flagship station is KSOS in Las Vegas, Nevada.

Full-powered stations

Translators
In addition to its full-powered stations, Sounds of the Spirit is relayed by an additional 21 translators.

References

External links
Official site

American radio networks
Christian radio stations in the United States